Upton Rock is a rock lying 3 nautical miles (6 km) northwest of Flat Top Peninsula, King George Island, in the South Shetland Islands. Named by the United Kingdom Antarctic Place-Names Committee (UK-APC) in 1961 for Benjamin Upton, Master of the American sealing vessel Nancy from Salem, MA, which visited the South Shetland Islands in 1821–22.

Rock formations of King George Island (South Shetland Islands)